Oxylobus is a genus of beetles in the family Carabidae, containing the following species:

 Oxylobus alternans Andrewes, 1929
 Oxylobus alveolatus Chaudoir, 1879
 Oxylobus armatus Andrewes, 1929
 Oxylobus asperulus Chaudoir, 1857
 Oxylobus bipunctatus Andrewes, 1929
 Oxylobus dekkanus Andrewes, 1929
 Oxylobus dentatus Andrewes, 1929
 Oxylobus dispar Andrewes, 1929
 Oxylobus dissors Tschitscherine, 1894
 Oxylobus exiguus Andrewes, 1933
 Oxylobus follis Andrewes, 1929
 Oxylobus foveiger Chaudoir, 1879
 Oxylobus inaequalis Andrewes, 1929
 Oxylobus ingens Andrewes, 1929
 Oxylobus lateralis (Dejean, 1825)
 Oxylobus lirifer Andrewes, 1929
 Oxylobus mahratta Andrewes, 1929
 Oxylobus meridionalis H. W. Bates, 1891
 Oxylobus montanus Andrewes, 1929
 Oxylobus nanus Andrewes, 1929
 Oxylobus ovalipennis Andrewes, 1929
 Oxylobus porcatus (Fabricius, 1798)
 Oxylobus punctatosulcatus Chaudoir, 1855
 Oxylobus pygmaeus Andrewes, 1929
 Oxylobus quadricollis Chaudoir, 1855
 Oxylobus rugatus Bänninger, 1928
 Oxylobus rugiceps Andrewes, 1929
 Oxylobus sculptilis (Westwood, 1845)
 Oxylobus silenticus S. K. Saha, 1989

References

Scaritinae